Dražen Pilčić (born 24 October 1989, in Rijeka) is a Croatian footballer currently playing for NK Grobničan.

Club career
While playing for NK Pomorac Kostrena, he was the league's top scorer during the 2012–13 Druga HNL season with 18 goals.

External links
 
PrvaLiga profile 

1989 births
Living people
Footballers from Rijeka
Association football forwards
Croatian footballers
NK Pomorac 1921 players
NK Grobničan players
HNK Rijeka players
FC Koper players
NK Bistra players
Croatian Football League players
First Football League (Croatia) players
Slovenian PrvaLiga players
Croatian expatriate footballers
Expatriate footballers in Slovenia
Croatian expatriate sportspeople in Slovenia